Prince Karl Franz Josef Wilhelm Friedrich Eduard Paul of Prussia (15 December 1916 – 23 January 1975) was the only child of Prince Joachim of Prussia and his wife Princess Marie-Auguste of Anhalt. He was also the grandson of Wilhelm II, German Emperor.

Early life

Prince Karl Franz was born on 15 December 1916 in Potsdam. He was the only child born to Prince Joachim of Prussia by his wife Princess Marie-Auguste of Anhalt. Karl Franz was the Emperor's fourth grandchild to be born since World War I began; he was consequently very young when Hohenzollern fortunes fell. His grandfather abdicated in 1918, and his father Prince Joachim committed suicide in 1920. At the time of his grandfather's abdication, Prince Karl Franz was twelfth in line of succession to the German and Prussian thrones.

After his father's suicide, Karl Franz was taken into custody by his paternal uncle Prince Eitel Friedrich of Prussia. As the legal head of the House of Hohenzollern, he claimed this right because Emperor Wilhelm had issued an edict placing Hohenzollern powers in Eitel's hands. This was later declared to have been illegal, and his mother was given full custody of him in 1921. She was given this right despite the fact that she had run away from her husband and that there had been numerous servants testifying against her. Eitel's defence had also stated that Marie-Auguste was not a fit person for Karl Franz's guardianship. Marie-Auguste went to court however and made a plea that she was heartbroken, which may have helped win the case for her.

In 1922, Marie-Auguste sued ex-Emperor Wilhelm for financial support that had been promised in her and Joachim's marriage contract. Wilhelm's attorney argued that the House of Hohenzollern laws were no longer valid, and therefore there was no obligation to support her.

In 1926, his mother remarried to Johannes-Michael, Baron von Loën. They were divorced in 1935.

In World War II, Karl Franz served as a lieutenant in an armoured car division, and at one point was stationed on the Polish front. He was awarded the Iron Cross.

Marriages

First
On 5 October 1940, Karl Franz married Princess Henriette Hermine Wanda Ida Luise of Schönaich-Carolath. She was a daughter of Princess Hermine Reuss of Greiz, who had been the second wife of Karl Franz's grandfather Emperor Wilhelm II since 1922 (Henriette was thus Kaiser Wilhelm's stepdaughter). Held at Wilhelm's private residence without much ceremony, he and Hermine attended the ceremony, as did a few other guests. The Mayor of Doorn performed the ceremony.

They had three children:
Prince Franz Wilhelm Viktor Christoph Stephan of Prussia (born 3 September 1943), he married on 4 September 1976 (civilly) and 22 September 1976 (religiously) a claimant to the Russian throne Maria Vladimirovna, Grand Duchess of Russia. Their child is Grand Duke George Mikhailovich of Russia, Prince of Prussia (born 13 March 1981). Franz Wilhelm married secondly on 14 March 2019 to Nadia Nour El Etreby (born 2 August 1949), with no issue.
Prince Friedrich Christian Ludwig of Prussia (3 September 1943 – 26 September 1943)
Prince Franz Friedrich Christian of Prussia (born 17 October 1944), firstly married in 1970 to Gudrun Winkler (born 29 January 1949) and had one daughter, Christine Prinzessin von Preussen (born 22 February 1968), they later divorced in 1996. He married secondly in 1998 to Potsdam politician and former pianist Susann Genske (born 12 January 1964), with no issue.

They divorced on 5 September 1946.

Second
Karl Franz married secondly, on 9 November 1946, to Luise Dora Hartmann (5 September 1909 Hamburg, Germany – 23 April 1961 Hamburg, Germany). The couple were childless and divorced in 1959.

Third
Karl Franz married lastly, on 20 July 1959 in Lima, Peru, Eva Maria Herrera y Valdeavellano (10 June 1922 Lima, Peru – 6 March 1987 Lima, Peru). They were married until Prince Karl's death and had two daughters;

Alexandra Maria Augusta Juana Consuelo Prinzessin von Preußen (born 29 April 1960 Lima, Peru). She married Dr. Alberto Reboa in October 1995 in Hechingen, Germany. They have two children:
Alberto Reboa y von Preußen (b. 8 April 1994 Miami, United States)
Alexandra Reboa y von Preußen (b. 8 July 1995 Lima, Peru)
Désirée Anastasia Maria Benedicta Prinzessin von Preußen (born 13 July 1961 Lima, Peru). She married Juan Carlos Gamarra y Skeels on 25 May 1983 at Lima, Peru. They have two children:
Juan Francisco Gamarra y von Preußen (b. 1 March 1987 Montevideo, Uruguay)
Ines Sofia Gamarra y von Preußen (b. 28 April 1989 Lima, Peru).

Ancestry

References

1916 births
1975 deaths
Prussian princes
House of Hohenzollern
People from Potsdam
German Army officers of World War II